Bonafede is a surname. Notable people with this surname include:

 Niccolò Bonafede (died 1533), Roman Catholic Bishop of Chiusi 

 Alfonso Bonafede, Italian lawyer and former Minister of Justice until June 2018 
 Bruce Bonafede, American author, award-winning playwright, and ghostwriter 
 Carl Bonafede, American-born Italian businessman
 Francis Bonafede, Monegasque sport shooter
 Victor Bonafède, Monegasque sport shooter